Alfons Oswald was a Swiss sailor. He competed in the Firefly event at the 1948 Summer Olympics.

References

External links
 

Year of birth missing
Possibly living people
Swiss male sailors (sport)
Olympic sailors of Switzerland
Sailors at the 1948 Summer Olympics – Firefly
Place of birth missing (living people)
20th-century Swiss people